Warwick is the county town of Warwickshire, England.

Warwick may also refer to:

Places

England
 Warwick Castle, Warwick
 Warwick District, a local government district in Warwickshire
 Warwick-on-Eden, Cumbria
 University of Warwick, in Coventry

Australia
 Warwick, Queensland, a town
 Warwick, Western Australia, a suburb of Perth

Bermuda
 Warwick Parish, a parish
 Warwick Camp (Bermuda), a British Army base

Canada
 Warwick, Ontario, village and township in Lambton County
 Warwick, Quebec, a town
 Warwick Mountain, Alberta

United States
 Warwick, Georgia, a city
 Warwick, Maryland, an unincorporated community
 Warwick, Massachusetts, a town
 Warwick, New York, a town
 Warwick (village), New York, a village
 Warwick, North Dakota, a city
 Warwick, Oklahoma, a town
 Warwick, Rhode Island, a city
 Warwick, Virginia, an extinct independent city
 Warwick Township (disambiguation)

Other places
 Warwick Airport (disambiguation)
 Warwick Hotel (disambiguation)
 Warwick station (disambiguation)

Organisations
 Warwick (car) a British small production car company
 Warwick (company), a German bass guitar manufacturer
 Warwick Records (United Kingdom), a record label
 Warwick Records (United States), a record label
 Warwick Films a British film production company
 Warwick's, American bookstore

Other
 Warwick (given name)
 Warwick (surname)
 Radio Warwick, at the University of Warwick, Coventry
 Vickers Warwick, World War II RAF patrol aircraft

See also
 Warwick and Leamington (UK Parliament constituency), in Warwickshire, England
 Warwick Bridge, a village in Cumbria, England
 Warwick, a character in League of Legends.
 Warwicksland, Cumbria, England in the List of United Kingdom locations: Wam-Way
 Warwickshire, a county in England